Kovčín is a municipality and village in Klatovy District in the Plzeň Region of the Czech Republic. It has about 90 inhabitants.

History
The first written mention of Kovčín is from 1551, when it was part of the Zelená Hora estate.

Gallery

References

Villages in Klatovy District